Amelia Afuhaamango Tuipulotu is a Tongan nurse and former Minister of Health.

Tuipulotu trained as a nurse, and worked in Australia and Tonga. She received an Australian Development Scholarship to attend the University of Sydney, and in 2012 became the first Tongan to receive a Nursing PhD. After graduation, she worked for Tonga's Ministry of Health, becoming Matron of the Nursing Department at Vaiola Hospital in Tonga.

In October 2019 she was appointed Minister of Health in the cabinet of Pohiva Tuʻiʻonetoa. Tuipulotu was the only Minister from outside the Legislative Assembly of Tonga.

In May 2020 she was elected to a position of Rapporteur on the World Health Organization's executive board. In December 2021 newly-elected Prime Minister Siaosi Sovaleni replaced her as Minister of Health, reappointing her predecessor Saia Piukala. In December 2022 she was appointed the WHO's Chief Nursing Officer.

Honours
National honours
  Order of the Crown of Tonga, Member (6 July 2021).

References

Living people
Ministers of Health of Tonga
Women government ministers of Tonga
University of Sydney alumni
21st-century women politicians
Year of birth missing (living people)
Members of the Order of the Crown of Tonga